William Harrison Barnie (January 26, 1853 – July 15, 1900), nicknamed "Bald Billy", was an American manager and catcher in Major League Baseball. Born in New York City, he played as a right fielder in the National Association in 1874–75. In 1883 he became manager of the Baltimore Orioles of the American Association; he appeared as a backup catcher that season, and also played two games in 1886, but otherwise did not take the field. After leaving the Orioles following the 1891 season, he managed the Washington Senators (1892), Louisville Colonels (1893–94) and Brooklyn Bridegrooms (1897–98). His career managerial record consists of 632 wins and 810 losses. His best finish was third place with the 1887 Orioles.

Barnie died in Hartford, Connecticut at the age of 47, of pneumonia complicated by asthmatic bronchitis, and was interred at Green-Wood Cemetery in Brooklyn, New York.

See also
List of Major League Baseball player–managers

References

External links
Baseball-Reference.com – career managing record and playing statistics

1853 births
1900 deaths
Baseball managers
Major League Baseball player-managers
Baltimore Orioles (1882–1899) managers
Washington Senators (NL) managers
Louisville Colonels managers
Brooklyn Bridegrooms managers
19th-century baseball players
Hartford Dark Blues players
Keokuk Westerns players
New York Mutuals players
Baltimore Orioles (AA) players
Burials at Green-Wood Cemetery
Baseball players from New York City
Columbus Buckeyes (minor league) players
Buffalo (minor league baseball) players
New Bedford (minor league baseball) players
New Haven (minor league baseball) players
Hartford (minor league baseball) players
San Francisco Knickerbockers players
Brooklyn Atlantics (minor league) players
St. Paul Saints (Western League) players
Fort Wayne (minor league baseball) players
Minor league baseball managers
Washington Senators (1891–1899) managers
Baltimore Orioles (Atlantic Association) players